The 31st British Academy Scotland Awards were held on 20 November 2021 at BBC Pacific Quay in a socially distanced, closed-studio show, honouring the best Scottish film and television productions of 2020. The nominations were announced by Edith Bowman on 13 October 2021.

Nominees

Winners are listed first and highlighted in boldface.

Outstanding Contribution to Film & Television
TBC

Outstanding Contribution to Craft
TBC

Outstanding Contribution to the Scottish Industry
TBC

See also
74th British Academy Film Awards
93rd Academy Awards
27th Screen Actors Guild Awards

References

External links
BAFTA Scotland Home page

2021
British Academy Scotland Awards
British Academy Scotland Awards
British Academy Scotland Awards
British Academy Scotland Awards
British Academy Scotland Awards
British Academy Scotland Awards
British Academy Scotland Awards
British Academy Scotland Awards, 2021